The ASW 19 is a single-seat glider built by Alexander Schleicher GmbH & Co, first flying in 1975. It was originally designed as a Standard Class glider, but now mainly competes in the Club Class. The ASW 19 is known for its pleasant handling and some clubs use it as a training glider. It was succeeded by the all-new Schleicher ASW 24.

Design
The wings are from the ASW 15 with upper-surface Schempp-Hirth metal air brakes added. Later models received modified brakes with an additional panel to improve effectiveness.

The all-new fibreglass fuselage was built without the honeycombs that were used on the ASW 15 and ASW 17.

The wings are held in place with two main pins. The tail unit is also of glassfibre/foam sandwich, and the horizontal tailplane has a fixed stabilizer.

Variants
With the ASW 19b version, the maximum allowed amount of water ballast increased and the take-off weight can be raised to 454 kg. Later ASW 19B were delivered with an instrument panel that lifts with the canopy. This feature can be retrofitted to older models.

The ASW 19 Club is a version with a fixed unsprung monowheel and no water ballast carried. Only five were built for the Royal Air Force, where they were known as the Valiant TX.1.

A single ASW 19 was fitted with a new wing profile featuring turbulator blow holes at the Technical University of Delft. This ASW 19X showed improved gliding capabilities with a best glide ratio of about 41:1.

Operators

Royal Air Force
University College London Gliding Club

3 French Air Force ("F05" n°276, "F06" n°277,"F07" n°323)

Specifications (ASW 19b)

See also

References

External links

Schleicher web site
Geelong Gliding Club web site
Sailplane Directory
ASW 19 production list
Johnson R, A Flight Test Evaluation of the ASW-19, Soaring, August 1977

1970s German sailplanes
Schleicher aircraft
T-tail aircraft
Aircraft first flown in 1975
Shoulder-wing aircraft